Trinchesia beta is a species of sea slug, an aeolid nudibranch, a marine gastropod mollusc in the family Trinchesiidae.

Distribution
This species was described from the vicinity of the Noto marine laboratory, Ogi, Toyama Bay with additional specimens from Kannonzaki and Tsukumo Bay, Hosu-gun, Noto-cho, Noto Peninsula, Ishikawa Prefecture, Japan. It is also reported from Kurasaki Beach, Amami Ōshima.

Description 
The typical adult size of this species is 4–10 mm.

References 

 Baba, K.; Abe, T. (1964). A catrionid, Catriona beta n. sp., with a radula of Cuthona type (Nudibranchia Eolidoidea). Annual Report of the Noto Marine Laboratory. 4:9-14, pl. 1
 Miller, M. C. (2004). An appraisal of the identity of the New Zealand species of the aeolid nudibranch family Tergipedidae (Gastropoda: Opisthobranchia). Journal of Natural History 38: 1183-1192
 Spencer, H.G., Marshall, B.A. & Willan, R.C. (2009). Checklist of New Zealand living Mollusca. pp 196–219. in: Gordon, D.P. (ed.) New Zealand inventory of biodiversity. Volume one. Kingdom Animalia: Radiata, Lophotrochozoa, Deuterostomia. Canterbury University Press, Christchurch.

External links
 Spencer H.G., Willan R.C., Marshall B.A. & Murray T.J. (2011). Checklist of the Recent Mollusca Recorded from the New Zealand Exclusive Economic Zone

Trinchesiidae
Gastropods described in 1964